Max Oertli (1921–2007) was a Swiss painter.

References
This article was initially translated from the German Wikipedia.

20th-century Swiss painters
Swiss male painters
21st-century Swiss painters
21st-century Swiss male artists
1921 births
2007 deaths
20th-century Swiss male artists